Albert Frank Moritz (born April 15, 1947) is a United States-born Canadian poet, teacher, and scholar.

Born in Niles, Ohio, Moritz was educated at Marquette University. Since 1975, he has made his home in Toronto, Ontario where he has worked variously as an advertising copywriter and executive, editor, publisher, and university professor. His poetry has been honored with a 1990 Guggenheim Fellowship, inclusion in the Princeton Series of Contemporary Poets, and numerous other awards. He currently teaches at Victoria College in the University of Toronto.

He was the winner of the ReLit Award for poetry in 2005 for Night Street Repairs, the Griffin Poetry Prize in 2009 for The Sentinel, and the Raymond Souster Award in 2013 for The New Measures. He is a three-time nominee for the Governor General's Award for English-language poetry, receiving nominations at the 2000 Governor General's Awards for Rest on the Flight into Egypt, at the 2008 Governor General's Awards for The Sentinel, and at the 2012 Governor General's Awards for The New Measures.

In 2019, Moritz was named as the new Poet Laureate of Toronto.

In May 2019 the Redpath Sugar company decided to withdraw their invitation for Moritz to recite a new poem he had composed at a celebration of the 60th anniversary of their opening of the Redpath Sugar Refinery, on Toronto's waterfront.  Passages in his poem reflected on the sugar industry's dark legacy of the use of slave labour.  Moritz said he was not offended by Redpath rescinding his invitation, comparing the anniversary celebration to a wedding, where those organizing the event had an unquestionable right to control the event.

He is married to Theresa Moritz, with whom he has collaborated on a number of books.

Bibliography

Poetry
Here – 1975
Signs and Certainties – 1979
Black Orchid – 1981
Between the Root and the Flower – 1982
The Visitation – 1983
The Tradition – 1986
Song of Fear – 1992
The Ruined Cottage – 1993
Ciudad interior – 1993
Phantoms in the Ark – 1994 (with Ludwig Zeller)
Mahoning – 1994
Early Poems
Conflicting Desire
The End of the Age
A Houseboat on the Styx - 1998
Rest on the Flight into Egypt – 1999
Night Street Repairs (House of Anansi Press, 2004)
The Sentinel (House of Anansi Press, 2008) – winner of the 2009 Canadian Griffin Poetry Prize)
The New Measures - (House of Anansi Press, 2012)
Sequence - (House of Anansi Press, 2015)
The Sparrow (House of Anansi Press, 2018)
As Far As You Know (House of Anansi Press, 2020)

Non-fiction
Canada Illustrated
America the Picturesque
The Pocket Canada: A Guidebook – 1982
Leacock: A Biography – 1985 (with Theresa Moritz)
The Oxford Literary Guide to Canada – 1987 (with Theresa Moritz)
The World's Most Dangerous Woman: A New Biography of Emma Goldman (with Theresa Moritz)
Stephen Leacock: His Remarkable Life (with Theresa Moritz)

Translations
Children of the Quadrilateral: Selected Poems of Benjamin Péret
Testament of Man: Selected Poems of Gilberto Meza
Ludwig Zeller in the Country of the Antipodes: Poems 1964–1979
The Marble Head and Other Poems, by Ludwig Zeller
The Ghost's Tattoos, by Ludwig Zeller
Body of Insomnia and Other Poems, by Ludwig Zeller
Rio Loa: Station of Dreams, by Ludwig Zeller

References

External links

A. F. Moritz Official Website
The Albert Frank (A.F.) Moritz fonds at the Victoria University Library at the University of Toronto

1947 births
Living people
Canadian male poets
Canadian literary critics
People from Niles, Ohio
Poets Laureate of Toronto
American expatriate writers in Canada
Canadian male non-fiction writers
Academic staff of the University of Toronto
20th-century Canadian poets
21st-century Canadian poets
20th-century American poets
21st-century American poets
20th-century Canadian male writers
21st-century Canadian male writers